Lovington is a city in, and the county seat of, Lea County, New Mexico, United States. The population was 11,009 at the 2010 census, up from 9,471 in 2000.

Geography
Lovington is located slightly north of the center of Lea County at  (32.946459, -103.353618). U.S. Route 82 passes through the center of town, leading west  to Artesia and northeast  to Plains, Texas. New Mexico State Road 18 leads southeast from Lovington  to Hobbs, the largest city in Lea County. State Road 83 leads east  to the Texas border, where Texas State Highway 83 continues east  to Denver City, Texas.

Demographics

At the 2000 census there were 9,471 people, 3,297 households, and 2,459 families living in the city. The population density was 1,983.6 people per square mile (766.6/km). There were 3,823 housing units at an average density of 800.7 per square mile (309.4/km). The racial makeup of the city was 59.85% White, 3.03% African American, 0.78% Native American, 0.48% Asian, 0.06% Pacific Islander, 32.74% from other races, and 3.06% from two or more races. Hispanic or Latino of any race were 52.12%.

Of the 3,297 households 41.6% had children under the age of 18 living with them, 57.0% were married couples living together, 13.0% had a female householder with no husband present, and 25.4% were non-families. 22.8% of households were one person and 11.5% were one person aged 65 or older. The average household size was 2.80 and the average family size was 3.29.

The age distribution was 31.8% under the age of 18, 10.9% from 18 to 24, 25.8% from 25 to 44, 18.8% from 45 to 64, and 12.6% 65 or older. The median age was 31 years. For every 100 females, there were 96.8 males. For every 100 females age 18 and over, there were 94.3 males.

The median household income was $26,458 and the median family income was $30,064. Males had a median income of $28,547 versus $19,826 for females. The per capita income for the city was $12,752. About 20.1% of families and 22.1% of the population were below the poverty line, including 28.1% of those under age 18 and 16.2% of those age 65 or over.

Education
Lovington Municipal Schools is the area school district. It operates Lovington High School.

Notable people
 Ray Berry, American football player
 Ronnie Black, professional golfer
 Taymon Domzalski, retired professional and Duke University basketball star
 Paul L. Foster, billionaire  and President of Western Refining 
 Shirley Hooper, 18th Secretary of State of New Mexico
 Sean Murphy, professional golfer
 Earlene Roberts (1935–2013), politician
 Ralph Tasker, basketball coach 
 Titanic Thompson, legendary gambler, raconteur
 Brian Urlacher, retired NFL football player, pro football hall of fame class of 2018

References

External links

Cities in New Mexico
Cities in Lea County, New Mexico
County seats in New Mexico